Route 224 is a highway in western Missouri.  Its eastern terminus is at U.S. Route 24 near Lexington; its western terminus is at US 24 west of Napoleon. It follows the Missouri River and is prone to flooding.

History
Before 1959, U.S. Route 24 used to travel through Napoleon and Lexington. A bypass was finished in 1959 which caused US 24 to reroute onto the bypass. This resulted in the creation of US 24 Business. It remained like that until 1969 when the business route was removed. This led to the creation of Route 224 and still remains like this to this day.

Major intersections

References

224
Transportation in Lafayette County, Missouri